The second season of Power Couple premiered on Tuesday, April 18, 2017 at 10:30 p.m. on RecordTV.

The show features eleven celebrity couples living under one roof and facing extreme challenges that will test how well they really know each other. Each week, a couple will be eliminated until the last couple wins the grand prize.

Nayara Justino & Cairo Jardim won the competition with 65.07% of the public vote over MC Marcelly & Frank Cavalcante and Fábio Villa Verde & Regiane Cesnique and took home the R$399.000 prize they accumulated during the show. Marcelly & Frank received a brand new car as the runners-up.

Cast

Couples

Future appearances
After this season, in 2017, Marcelo Zangrandi (from Marcelo & Júlia) appeared in A Fazenda 9, he finished in 8th place.

After this season, in 2018, Rafael Ilha (from Rafael & Aline) appeared in A Fazenda 10, where he won the competition.

After this season, in 2020, Carol Narizinho (from Carol & Mateus) appeared in A Fazenda 12, she finished 16th place.

The game
Key

Challenges' results

Notes

Special power
For the first five weeks, the Couple's challenge winners randomly will pick two out of eight envelopes of the following colors: yellow, orange, grey, green, pink, blue, white and red. Then, the couple will be given a choice between two advantages in the game. The couple's choice is marked in bold.
Results

Voting history

Notes

Ratings and reception

Brazilian ratings
All numbers are in points and provided by Kantar Ibope Media.

References

External links 
 Power Couple 2 on R7.com

2017 Brazilian television seasons
Power Couple (Brazilian TV series)